The District Council of Peterborough is a local government area in the Yorke and Mid North region of South Australia. The principal town and council seat is Peterborough; it also includes the localities of Cavenagh, Dawson, Hardy, Minvalara, Nackara, Oodla Wirra, Paratoo, Parnaroo, Sunnybrae, Ucolta and Yongala.

It was formed on 21 March 1935, when the District Council of Coglin and the District Council of Yongala merged with part of the Corporate Town of Peterborough to create the new council. The remainder of the Corporate Town of Peterborough continued on as an independent municipality surrounded by the District Council until the two were amalgamated in 1997. It still operates out of the heritage-listed 1927 Peterborough Town Hall.

Council

The District Council of Peterborough has a directly elected mayor.

Mayors and Chairmen of the District Council of Peterborough

 Ernest Dewar Sawers (1935–1939)
 Thomas Edward Richards (1939-1941)
 Harold Davies (1941-1950)
 Hubert William Lang (1950-1951)
 Leslie Allan McPherson (1951-1954)
 Maxwell Edward Hams (1954–1966)
 Woodrow Eric Douglas Chapman (1966–1967)
 Ronald Naish Bailey (1967-after 1985)
 Ruth Whittle (1991–present)

See also
List of parks and gardens in rural South Australia

References

External links
 

Peterborough
Mid North (South Australia)